The 1962 Alaska gubernatorial election took place on November 6, 1962, for the post of Governor of Alaska. Incumbent Democratic governor William A. Egan was re-elected, defeating Republican challenger and former governor of Alaska Territory Mike Stepovich. In the primary elections, Egan defeated George Byer and Warren A. Taylor, while Stepovich defeated Howard Wallace Pollock and Jack Coghill.

Results

References

Gubernatorial
1962
Alaska
November 1962 events in the United States